Elmer Pendell (July 28, 1894-March 18, 1982) was an American eugenicist and sociologist.

Early life 

Pendell was born in Waverly, New York to George and Ida Harris PenDell. Pendell received his B.S. from the University of Oregon; M.A. from the University of Chicago; PhD from Cornell University; L.L.B. from George Washington University.

Pendell was a first lieutenant in the infantry in first World War where he was awarded the Distinguished Service Cross and the Purple Heart. Pendell was an economic analyst for the Republican National Committee in 1944. He was then a researcher for Colorado Senator Eugene Milliken.

Pendell taught as a Professor of Economics at Cornell, Baldwin-Wallace College, Olivet College, Pennsylvania State, University of Arkansas, Oklahoma A&M, Jacksonville State College. Pendell ended his teaching career at Jacksonville State College, retiring in 1965 after teaching there since 1957.

Pendell was a Republican Party candidate for the Alabama House of Representatives in 1966, losing to incumbent Rep. Hugh Merrill, an ally of Governor George Wallace.

Writing 
Ashley Montagu, reviewing Pendell's edited volume Society under Analysis (1942), wrote that "none of the authors contributing to the present volume shows any but the merest tangential acquaintance with the physical sciences with which they deal".

Reviewing Pendell's 1945 book Population Roads to Peace or War, co-authored with Guy Irving Burch, Paul H. Landis wrote that "[s]ociologists will … classify it as propaganda rather than an objective scientific statement". The work argued that democracy would be imperilled if population growth did not slow. A 1947 follow-up to the work, similarly titled Human Breeding and Survival: Population Roads to Peace or War, advocated population limitation as a means of reducing social problems such as hunger.

Pendell was the author of seven books on economics. Pendell was buried at Arlington National Cemetery.

Works

References

1894 births
1982 deaths
American sociologists
American eugenicists
University of Oregon alumni
University of Chicago alumni
Cornell University alumni